Reginald E. Baines (3 June 1907 – 21 October 1974) was an English footballer.

Baines started his career with York City whilst the club was playing in the Midland League. He then played for Selby Town and Scarborough, until eventually re-joining York City in September 1931. He scored on his debut in the Football League against Carlisle United, which ended a 1–1 draw.

He was top scorer for Doncaster with 19 goals in 39 games during the 1935–36 season, even though the club finished 18th out of 22 in Division 2.

References

1907 births
Footballers from York
1974 deaths
English footballers
Association football forwards
York City F.C. players
Selby Town F.C. players
Scarborough F.C. players
Sheffield United F.C. players
Doncaster Rovers F.C. players
Barnsley F.C. players
Halifax Town A.F.C. players
English Football League players
Midland Football League players